Jean-Pierre Claris de Florian (6 March 1755 in the château of Florian, near Sauve, Gard – 13 September 1794 in Sceaux) was a French poet, novelist and fabulist.

Life
Florian's mother, a Spanish lady named Gilette de Salgues, died when he was a child. He was brought up by his grandfather and studied at St. Hippolyte. His uncle and guardian, the Marquis of Florian, who had married a niece of Voltaire, introduced him at the château de Ferney and in 1768 he became page at Anet in the household of the Duc de Penthièvre, who remained his friend throughout his life. Having studied for some time at the artillery school at Bapaume he obtained from his patron a captain's commission in the dragoon regiment of Penthièvre.

He left the army soon after and began to write comedies, and was elected to the Académie française in 1788. On the outbreak of the French Revolution he retired to Sceaux, but he was soon discovered and imprisoned; and though Robespierre's death spared him, he died a few months later still in prison. The cause of death was tuberculosis.

Works

To later readers, Florian was chiefly known as the author of pretty fables well suited as reading for the young, but his contemporaries praised him also for his poetical and pastoral novels. Florian was very fond of Spain and its literature, doubtless owing to the influence of his Castilian mother, and both abridged and imitated the works of Cervantes.

Florian's first literary efforts were comedies; his verse epistle Voltaire et le serf du Mont Jura and an eclogue Ruth were crowned by the Académie française in 1782 and 1784 respectively. In 1782 also he produced a one-act prose comedy, Le Bon Ménage, and in the next year Galatie, a romantic tale in imitation of the Galatea of Cervantes. Other short tales and comedies followed, and in 1786 appeared Numa Pompilius, an undisguised imitation of Fénelon's Telémaque.

In 1788 he became a member of the Académie française, and published Estelle, a pastoral of the same class as Galatie. Another romance, Gonzalve de Cordoue, preceded by an historical notice of the Moors, appeared in 1791, and his famous collection of Fables in 1802. Among his posthumous works are La Jeunesse de Florian, ou Mémoires d'un Jeune Espagnol (1807), and an abridgment (1809) of Don Quixote, which, though far from being a correct representation of the original, had great success.

Florian imitated Salomon Gessner, the Swiss idyllist, and his style had all the artificial delicacy and sentimentality of the Gessnerian school. Perhaps the nearest example of the class in English literature was afforded by John Wilson's  Lights and Shadows of Scottish Life (written as Christopher North). Among the best of his fables were reckoned The Monkey showing the Magic Lantern, The Blind Man and the Paralytic, and The Monkeys and the Leopard.

Selected works
Fables
The Blind man and the Paralytic
The Monkey and the Magic Lantern
The Monkeys and the Leopard
The Fable and the Truth
The Crocodile and the Sturgeon'The Child and the MirrorThe Old Tree and the GardenerThe Nightingale and the PrinceThe Two TravelersThe Cricket (also known as True Happiness)
TheatreLes Deux Billets (1779)Le Bon Ménage (1782)Le Bon Père (1784)Les Jumeaux de Bergame (1782)
OtherPastoralesVariétés et contes en versPlaisir d'amour, a songMémoires d'un jeune EspagnolFamous verses
Florian wrote a collection of fables.  From these fables several expressions have passed into colloquial French:
 Pour vivre heureux, vivons cachés: "In order to live happily, live hidden"
 Chacun son métier, les vaches seront bien gardées: "To each his occupation, and the cows will be well guarded."
 Rira bien qui rira le dernier: "He who laughs last laughs best."

The expression éclairer la lanterne ("light the lantern") is also drawn from Florian's fables.

His most famous verse is Plaisir d'amour, a poem he put in his story Celestine. The verse became a song which has survived to the 21st century.

 Heraldry 
Blason: Or an eagle sable on a chief azure a sun or (the coat of arms of his birthplace of Florian) to which the eagle looks (for difference).

Bibliography
Florian, Fables, edited by Jean-Noël Pascal, Ferney-Voltaire, Centre international d'étude du XVIIIe siècle, 2005, Florian le fabuliste by Jean-Luc Gourdin, biography, Ramsay, 2003.Florian, l'homme à fables'', illustrated by Jean-François Ramirez, collection of 40 fables selected by Florian Mantione, 1997, Edition Athéna-Paris

See also

Fable

Notes

External links

 
 Complete works for Theatre on the site CÉSAR
 The Text of Théatre Italien vol.2
 The 1895 illustrated Japanese edition of the first volume of the Fables
 Official page at the Académie française
 
 

1755 births
1794 deaths
18th-century French dramatists and playwrights
18th-century French poets
18th-century French male writers
18th-century deaths from tuberculosis
People from Gard
Spanish–French translators
French people of Spanish descent
Members of the Académie Française
French fabulists
Tuberculosis deaths in France
18th-century French translators